Ricardo Fidel Pacheco Rodríguez (born 18 September 1963) is a Mexican politician affiliated with the PRI. As of 2013 he served as Deputy of the LXII Legislature of the Mexican Congress representing Durango. He also served as Senator during the LX and LXI Legislatures.

References

1963 births
Living people
Politicians from Durango
Members of the Senate of the Republic (Mexico)
Members of the Chamber of Deputies (Mexico)
Institutional Revolutionary Party politicians
20th-century Mexican politicians
21st-century Mexican politicians
Universidad Juárez del Estado de Durango alumni
Members of the Congress of Durango